Molly Conlin (born 23 February 2001) is a former English actress, known for her role as Dotty Cotton on the BBC soap opera EastEnders.

Personal life
Conlin was born in Canning Town, London where she lives with her mother and her brother, Jack. In 2008 Conlin signed up at the Sylvia Young agency, Marylebone.

Career

EastEnders

In 2008, Nick Cotton (John Altman) returned to EastEnders. joined by Conlin, in the role of Dotty Cotton. Conlin was seven at the time. Speaking of her casting, Conlin said, "I'm really excited about it because I have always wanted to be in EastEnders." Conlin was considered too old for the part of Tiffany Dean which she previously auditioned for but she succeeded in impressing the producers, who offered her the role of Dotty instead. The part of Tiffany went to Maisie Smith. Originally eleven years old, they changed Dotty's age to seven to accommodate Conlin's casting. Introduced as a guest character by Santer, she made her first appearance on 26 December 2008. She started to appear more frequently, becoming a recurring character, until Dotty later left on 23 February 2010.

Filmography

Advertisements 
 Ragu pasta sauce
 Heinz beans
 Bold 2 in 1

References

External links
 

2001 births
English actresses
English child actresses
English soap opera actresses
Living people
People from Canning Town
21st-century English actresses
Actresses from London